The NDF Rebellion was an uprising in the Yemen Arab Republic by the National Democratic Front, under Yahya Shami, between 1978 and 1982.

History

1978 start
The rebellion began in 1978, following the death of Ahmad al-Ghashmi and the rise to power of Ali Abdullah Saleh. The NDF was supported in its rebellion by the PDRY and Libya. The NDF enjoyed various successes throughout the war, although it was weakened by the peace treaty between North and South Yemen following the 1979 border war.

There were several attempts at ceasefires between the government and the NDF. Kuwait managed to facilitate the signing of a ceasefire between the government and the NDF on 26 November 1981, although hostilities re-erupted in December 1981. Later, the Palestinian Liberation Organization was able to mediate a ceasefire agreement on 3 April 1982, however hostilities began again later the same April, with the NDF capturing Juban. Government forces in turn attacked NDF positions in Juban in May 1982.

May 1982
PDRY support for the NDF diminished under the Presidency of the less overtly militant Ali Nasir Muhammad, and PDRY support for the NDF finally ended in May 1982. Dhamar, a major NDF stronghold, sustained major damage during the 1982 North Yemen earthquake. The NDF was eventually defeated by a rejuvenated YAR Army in conjunction with the pro-government Islamic Front, allowing the YAR government to finally establish control over the North-South border region.

See also
List of wars involving Yemen

References
 

1978 in Yemen
Arab nationalist rebellions
Conflicts in 1978
Conflicts in 1979
Conflicts in 1980
Conflicts in 1981
Conflicts in 1982
Wars involving Yemen
South Yemen
Proxy wars
Wars involving Taiwan